Thom Jan Marinus Haye (born 9 February 1995) is a Dutch professional footballer who plays as a midfielder for Eredivisie club Heerenveen.

Club career

AZ
Haye was born in Amsterdam and is a youth exponent from AZ. He signed his first contract for AZ in February 2011. On 23 February 2014, he made his full debut for AZ in the Eredivisie against Ajax in a 4–0 away defeat, coming on as a 70th-minute substitute for Celso Ortíz. Haye scored his first professional goal in 24 September 2014, securing his club's advancement in the KNVB Cup in a 1–0 away win over EVV. He became a starter in the 2015–16 season, before making his debut in the UEFA Europa League in the 2016–17 season.

Willem II
On 19 June 2016, Haye signed a two-year deal with Willem II, after his contract with AZ expired. He made his debut on 6 August in a 4–1 home loss to Vitesse.

Lecce
On 31 May 2018, Haye signed a two-year contract with Italian Serie B club Lecce. He made his debut on 7 August, in the Coppa Italia match against Feralpisalò, which ended in a 1–0 win after extra time. He made his Serie B debut on 25 September, when he came on as a substitute in the second half of the 3–0 win against Livorno. Haye would go on to make 13 appearances in Serie B that season, which ended in promotion to Serie A. 

On 2 September 2019, after having failed to make an appearance in the top flight, he terminated his contract by mutual agreement.

ADO Den Haag
On 12 September 2019, Haye returned to the Netherlands to join Eredivisie side ADO Den Haag on a two-year deal. He made his first appearance upon his return in a 3–0 away loss to Emmen on 27 September, coming on as a late substitute for John Goossens. He mostly appeared as a substitute during his six months with ADO.

NAC Breda
In January 2020, Haye was sent on a six-month loan to NAC Breda in the second-tier Eerste Divisie. He made his debut on 31 January in a 2–2 away draw against Excelsior.

Haye signed a permanent deal with NAC on 1 July 2020, penning a three-year contract.

Heerenveen
On 31 January 2022, Haye signed for Heerenveen for an undisclosed fee, on a contract until summer 2024. He made his debut for the club on 5 February as a starter in the 2–0 loss to Fortuna Sittard. He immediately impressed, growing into a key player in his first six months at the club. In 16 league appearances, he recorded five assists.

Personal life
Haye is Indonesian descent from his grandfather who came from North Sulawesi.

Career statistics

Honours

International
Netherlands U17
 UEFA European Under-17 Championship: 2012

References

External links
Netherlands profile

1995 births
Living people
Indo people
Footballers from Amsterdam
Dutch footballers
Dutch expatriate footballers
Netherlands youth international footballers
Netherlands under-21 international footballers
Association football midfielders
Eredivisie players
Eerste Divisie players
Serie A players
Serie B players
Amsterdamsche FC players
AZ Alkmaar players
Willem II (football club) players
U.S. Lecce players
ADO Den Haag players
NAC Breda players
SC Heerenveen players
Expatriate footballers in Italy
Dutch expatriate sportspeople in Italy
Dutch people of Indonesian descent